Holland Park Press is an independent, privately owned, London-based publishing house. It was founded in 2009 by Bernadette Jansen op de Haar.

Holland Park Press has an Anglo-Dutch flavour as its speciality is to publish contemporary Dutch writers in Dutch and English. The company also publishes new works written in English and translations of classic Dutch novels. The Press specialises in fiction and poetry.

Holland Park Press also publishes an online magazine with weekly columns on topical issues.

Books by Holland Park Press

Eline Vere by Louis Couperus, completely revised translation of J. T. Grein
Angel by Arnold Jansen op de Haar, translated by Bernadette Jansen op de Haar
Engel by Arnold Jansen op de Haar
Top of the Sixties by David Ayres
The Lonely Tree by Yael Politis
King of Tuzla by Arnold Jansen op de Haar, translated by Paul Vincent
De koning van Tuzla by Arnold Jansen op de Haar
Hedwig’s Journey (original title: Van de koele meren des doods) by Frederik van Eeden, updated translation of Margaret Robinson
Yugoslav Requiem by Arnold Jansen op de Haar, translated by Paul Vincent
Joegoslavisch requiem by Arnold Jansen op de Haar
Finding Soutbek by Karen Jennings
Everything Must Go by Rosie Garland
To Sing Away the Darkest Days by Norbert Hirschhorn
Hold Still by Cherry Smyth
Where is My Mask of an Honest Man? by Laura Del-Rivo
Away from the Dead by Karen Jennings
Diaspo/Renga by Marilyn Hacker and Deema K. Shehabi
The Stray American by Wendy Brandmark
Place Lamartine by Jeroen Blokhuis
Lamartine Square by Jeroen Blokhuis
100 Dutch-Language Poems, From the Medieval Period to the Present Day, selected and translated by Paul Vincent and John Irons
Winegarden by Anthony Ferner
The Island by Karen Jennings – longlisted for the 2021 Booker Prize

References

External links 
 

Publishing companies established in 2009
British companies established in 2009
2009 establishments in England
Book publishing companies based in London